, or simply , is a legendary eight-headed and eight-tailed Japanese dragon/serpent.

Mythology

Yamata no Orochi legends are originally recorded in two ancient texts about Japanese mythology and history. In both versions of the Orochi myth, the Shinto storm god Susanoo (or "Susa-no-O") is expelled from Heaven for tricking his sister Amaterasu, the sun goddess.

The  tells the following version:

The  also describes Yamata no Orochi: "It had an eight-forked head and an eight-forked tail; its eyes were red, like the winter-cherry; and on its back firs and cypresses were growing. As it crawled it extended over a space of eight hills and eight valleys."

The legendary sword , which came from the tail of Yamata no Orochi, along with the  mirror and  jewel, became the three sacred Imperial Regalia of Japan.

Etymology

The Japanese name  derives from  Old Japanese  with a regular  from  shift, but its etymology is enigmatic. Besides this ancient  reading, the kanji, are commonly pronounced , "big snake; large serpent".

Carr notes that Japanese scholars have proposed "more than a dozen"  <  etymologies, while Western linguists have suggested loanwords from Austronesian, Tungusic, and Indo-European languages. Miller criticized Benedict for overlooking Old Japanese " 'tail' + suffix  – as well as an obvious Tungus etymology, [Proto-Tungus] *xürgü-či, 'the tailed one'", and notes "this apparently well-traveled  has now turned up in the speculation of the [Indo-European] folklorists." Littleton's hypothesis involves the 3-headed monster Trisiras or Viśvarūpa, which has a mythological parallel because Indra killed it after giving it soma, wine, and food, but lacks a phonological connection.

Mythological parallels

Polycephalic or multi-headed animals are rare in biology, but commonly feature in mythology and heraldry. Multi-headed dragons, like the 8-headed Orochi and 3-headed Trisiras above, are a common motif in comparative mythology. For instance, multi-headed dragons in Greek mythology include the 9-headed Lernaean Hydra and the 100-headed Ladon, both slain by Heracles.

Two other Japanese examples derive from Buddhist importations of Indian dragon myths. Benzaiten, the Japanese name of Saraswati, supposedly killed a 5-headed dragon at Enoshima in 552 AD. Kuzuryū ("9-headed dragon"), deriving from the Nagaraja snake-kings Vasuki and Shesha, is worshipped at Togakushi Shrine in Nagano Prefecture.

Comparing folklore about polycephalic dragons and serpents, 8-headed creatures are less common than 7- or 9-headed ones. Among Japanese numerals,  or  can mean "many; varied" (e.g., "greengrocer; jack-of-all-trades"). De Visser says the number 8 is "stereotypical" in legends about kings or gods riding dragons or having their carriages drawn by them. The slaying of the dragon is said to be similar to the legends of Cambodia, India, Persia, Western Asia, East Africa and the Mediterranean area. Smith identifies the mythic 7- or 8-headed dragons with the 7-spiked Pteria shell or 8-tentacled octopus.

The myth of a storm god fighting a sea serpent is itself a popular mythic trope potentially originating with the Proto-Indo-European religion and later transmitted into the religions of the ancient Near East most likely initially through interaction with Hittite speaking peoples into Syria and the Fertile Crescent. Often as these myths evolve from their original source, the role of the storm god (himself often the head of a pantheon) is adopted by culture heroes or a personage symbolizing royalty. In many examples, the serpent god is often seen as multi-headed or multi-tailed.
 
Thor vs. Jörmungandr (Norse)
Perun vs. Veles (Slavic)
Dobrynya Nikitich vs. Zmey Gorynych (Slavic)
Tarhunt vs. Illuyanka (Hittite)
Teshub vs. Ullikummi (Hurrian)
Zeus vs. Typhon (Greek)
Heracles vs. The Lernaean Hydra (Greek)
Apollo vs. Python (mythology) (Greek)
Indra vs. Vritra (Indian)
Krishna vs. Kāliyā (Indian)
Θraētaona vs. Aži Dahāka (Zoroastrian)
Garshasp vs. Zahhak (Iranian)
Saint George vs. the Dragon (Christian)
Saint Michael vs. Herensuge (Christian-Basque)
Făt-Frumos vs. Balaur (Romanian)
Baʿal vs. Yam (Canaanite)
Yu the Great vs. Xiangliu or Gong Gong (Chinese)
Marduk vs. Tiamat (Babylonian)
Ra vs. Apep (Egyptian)
Gabriel vs. Rahab (Jewish)
Christ vs. Satan (Christian)
 Mankan vs. Kuzuryū (Japanese Buddhism)
 Sigurd vs. Fafnir (Norse mythology)
 Quetzalcoatl vs. Cipactli (Aztec mythology)
 Benzaiten vs.  (Japanese Buddhism)
 Drangue vs. Kulshedra (Albanian mythology)
 Vahagn vs. Vishap (Armenian mythology)
 Lac Long Quan vs. Ngu Tinh (Vietnamese mythology)

The fight of a hero (sometimes of extraordinary birth) against a dragon who demands the sacrifice of maidens or princesses is a widespread tale. In folkloristics it falls under the Aarne–Thompson–Uther index type ATU 300, "The Dragonslayer".

In popular culture 
  (Yamata-no-Orochi and Keibu Keioiba) is a Meitei language play that interweaves the stories of the two legendary creatures, Yamata-no-Orochi of Japanese mythology and Keibu Keioiba of Meitei mythology (Manipuri mythology). In the play, the role of Yamata-no-Orochi was played by Maisnam Momocha.
 The 2019 film Godzilla: King of the Monsters mentions a Titan dubbed Titanus Yamata no Orochi or simply Yamata no Orochi, though it is not seen in the film. But the creature was seen in a monitor awakening in its containment field in Outpost 91 Mount Fuji, Japan with people trying to run to safety as it arises and escapes after being awoken by King Ghidorah alongside the other 17 titans.
 In the SCP Foundation, a creature dubbed SCP-1645 was described to have 8 heads resembling that of a Mamushi, similar to Yamata no Orochi's serpentine features. This creature was also found in Japan, which is Orochi's myth origination.
 In Eiichiro Oda's manga series One Piece, an antagonistic character named Kurozumi Orochi appears. He has the ability to transfrom into an eight-headed dragon, coming from a fruit named Hebi Hebi no Mi, Model: Yamata no Orochi (official english name: Snake-Snake Fruit, Model: Yamato no Orochi).
Referenced in Naruto when Itachi defeats Orochimaru with his move “Susanoo”
In the 2006 video game Ōkami, the main antagonist of the first story arc is Orochi, an 8-headed serpent. The player controls a white wolf named Amaterasu and defeats Orochi with the help of a man named Susano.
The video game series Megami Tensei features Yamamto-no-Orochi as a demon in multiple entries.

See also 
Lernaean Hydra
 Fafnir
 King Ghidorah, fictional kaiju and villain in the Godzilla film franchise inspired by Yamata no Orochi.
 Leviathan
 Princess and dragon
 The Three Treasures
Hydreigon

References

External links

 Yamata-no-orochi, Encyclopedia of Shinto
 Hyakkai Ryūran: Yamata-No-Orochi 
 Susanoo vs Yamata no Orochi animated depiction

Japanese dragons
Legendary serpents
Mythical many-headed creatures
ATU 300-399